Structured light is the process of projecting a known pattern (often grids or horizontal bars) on to a scene. The way that these deform when striking surfaces allows vision systems to calculate the depth and surface information of the objects in the scene, as used in structured light 3D scanners.

Invisible (or imperceptible) structured light uses structured light without interfering with other computer vision tasks for which the projected pattern will be confusing. Example methods include the use of infrared light or of extremely high frame rates alternating between two exact opposite patterns.

Structured light is used by a number of police forces for the purpose of photographing fingerprints in a 3D scene. Where previously they would use tape to extract the fingerprint and flatten it out, they can now use cameras and flatten the fingerprint digitally, which allows the process of identification to begin before the officer has even left the scene.

See also 
 Structured Illumination Microscopy (SIM)
 Stereoscopy
 3D scanner#Structured light
 Structured-light 3D scanners often employed in a multiple-camera setup in conjunction with structured light to capture the geometry of the target
 Dual photography
 More advanced light stages make use of structured light to capture geometry of the target. The primary use of a light stage is an instrumentation setup for reflectance capture.
 Depth map
 Laser Dynamic Range Imager
 Lidar
 Range imaging
 Kinect
 Time-of-flight camera

External links 

 Projector-Camera Calibration Toolbox
 Tutorial on Coded Light Projection Techniques
 Structured light using pseudorandom codes
 High-accuracy stereo depth maps using structured light
 A comparative survey on invisible structured light
 A Real-Time Laser Range Finding Vision System
 Dual-frequency Pattern Scheme for High-speed 3-D Shape Measurement
 High-Contrast Color-Stripe Pattern for Rapid Structured-Light Range Imaging

Image sensor technology in computer vision
Machine vision